Thomas Hood was an Australian politician.

He was a pastoralist and squatter. He was the elected member for Pastoral Districts of Clarence and Darling Downs of the New South Wales Legislative Council from 1855 to 1856, and an appointed member of the Council from 1856 to 1861.

References

 

Year of birth unknown
Year of death missing
Members of the New South Wales Legislative Council